Aleksandar Petrović (born February 8, 1985) is a Serbian former footballer.

Career
Born in Belgrade, Petrović began his career in his native country, Serbia when he played for FK BASK.

He played three seasons with BASK. During the 2006/07 season, he moved to FK Mladost Lučani and later on played two seasons with Mladost Lučani. He later on moved to FK Rad in the Serbian SuperLiga. During the 2010/11 season, he moved to FK Sloboda Point Sevojno. For the 2011 season, he played with Serbian club, FK Novi Pazar in the Serbian SuperLiga. Early in 2012 Petrović joined FK Radnički Niš in Serbian First League. After a year at Radnički Niš, he moved to the champions of the 2011 AFC Cup, FC Nasaf.

References

External links
 Profile at Srbijafudbal
 Aleksandar Petrović Stats at Utakmica.rs
 
 Petrovich has chosen Nasaf Qarshi! voha.uz

1985 births
Living people
Footballers from Belgrade
Serbian footballers
Serbian expatriate footballers
FK BASK players
FK Mladost Lučani players
FK Rad players
FK Novi Pazar players
Serbian SuperLiga players
Expatriate footballers in Uzbekistan
Association football defenders
Serbian expatriate sportspeople in Uzbekistan